= Anna-Kalliopi Kourousi =

Greek sabre fencer

Alina Kourousi
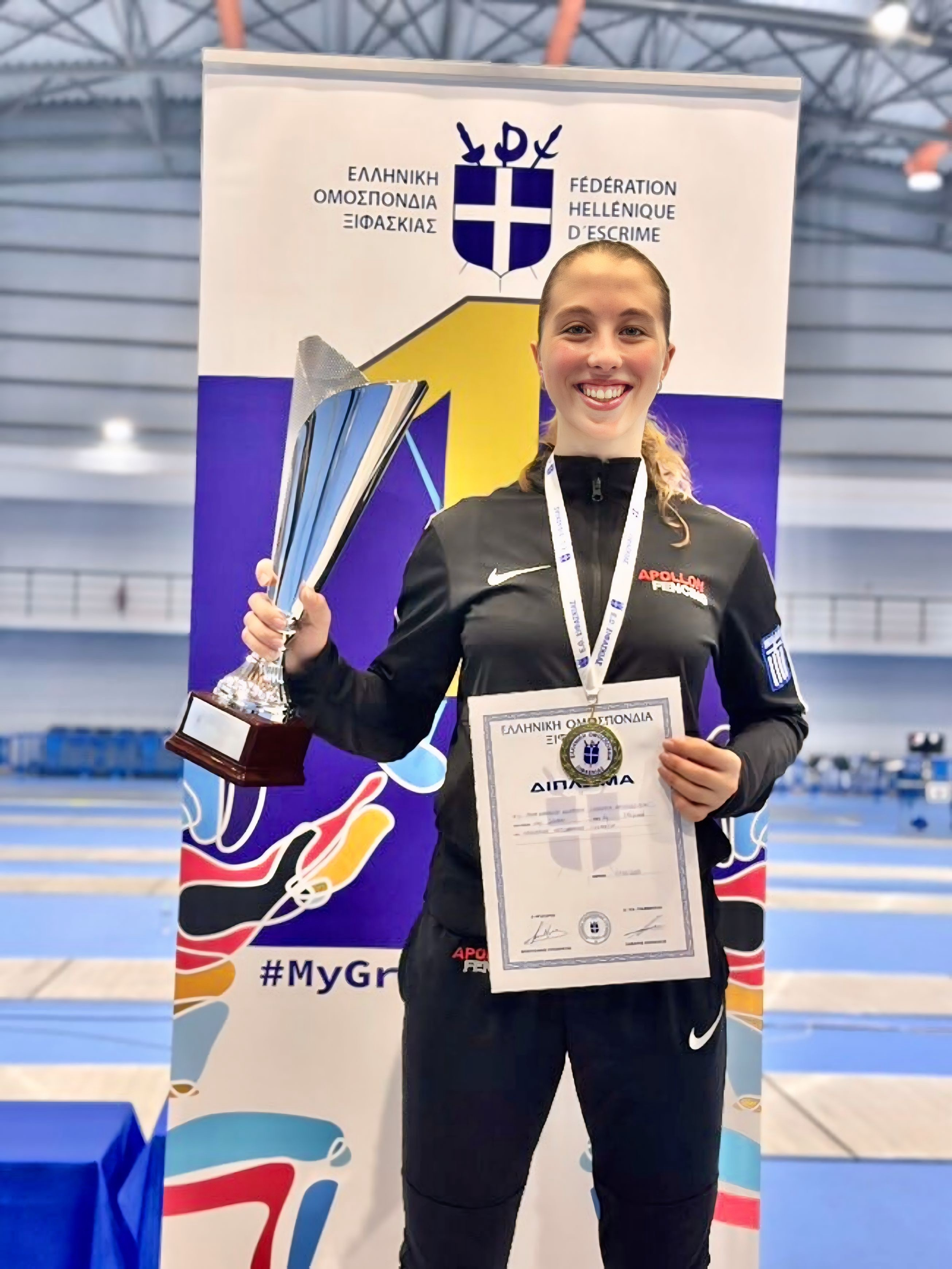
- Anna Kalliopi Kourousi at Olympic Fencing Arena for the 2025 Women's Sabre Championship

Personal information
- Full name: Anna Kalliopi Kourousi
- Born: October 18, 2008 (age 17)

Sport
- Country: Greece
- Sport: Fencing – Sabre
- Club: A.O. Apollon Vrilission
- Team: Greece women's national sabre team

Anna-Kalliopi Kourousi (Άννα-Καλλιόπη Κουρούση) born 18 October 2008) is a Greek sabre fencer and a member of the Greece women's national fencing team.

== Career in Greece ==
Kourousi has won Greek national championships across multiple age categories, including Senior Women, Junior (U20), Cadet (U17), and Under-13.

On 17 May 2025, at age 16, she won the Greek senior women's sabre championship. The same season she also won national titles in the junior and cadet categories.

== International achievements ==
In her final cadet season (2024–2025), Kourousi ranked first in the final European Fencing Confederation (EFC) cadet sabre ranking and was recognised as the cadet sabre category winner at the 2025 Cadets & Juniors European Championships in Antalya, Turkey.

She has also won medals at EFC Cadet Cups and Mediterranean Fencing Confederation championships.

== National team ==
Kourousi competes with the Greece women's national sabre team at European and World Championships.

== Club ==
At club level, she competes for A.O. Apollon Vrilission, coached by Giannis Notaras.

== Selected results ==
=== European Fencing Confederation Cadet Cups (EFC) ===
Year	Medal	Location
2023	Gold	Tbilisi, Georgia
2024	Gold	Tbilisi, Georgia
2024	Silver	Istanbul, Turkey
2024	Silver	Sofia, Bulgaria
2024	Silver	Bucharest, Romania
2025	Silver	Prague, Czech Republic

=== Mediterranean Championships (U15, U17) ===
Year	Medal	Location
2022	Gold	Amman, Jordan
2023	Gold	Zagreb, Croatia
2023	Silver	Zagreb, Croatia

=== Challenge Wratislavia ===
Year	Medal	Location
2021	Gold	Wroclaw, Poland
2023	Silver	Wroclaw, Poland

=== Greek National Individual Championships ===
Year	Location	Category	Medal
2020	OAKA Athens	U13 Sabre	Gold
2021	OAKA Athens	U13 Sabre	Gold
2022	OAKA Athens	Cadet Sabre	Bronze
2023	OAKA Athens	Cadet Sabre	Bronze
2023	OAKA Athens	Junior Sabre	Gold
2023	OAKA Athens	Women's Sabre	Bronze
2024	OAKA Athens	Cadet Sabre	Gold
2025	OAKA Athens	Cadet Sabre	Gold
2025	OAKA Athens	Junior Sabre	Gold
2025	OAKA Athens	Women's Sabre	Gold
2026	OAKA Paiania	Women's Sabre	Gold
